The Riverdale Branch of the Southern Pacific Railroad (SP) was a branch line serving the San Joaquin Valley's agricultural area southwest of Fresno.  The 42 mile line ran from a connection with the Southern Pacific's West Side Line at Ingle, California and then ran southeast through Burrel, Riverdale beyond which it also connected to the Caruthers Branch of the SP. From Riverdale it continued Southeast to Hardwick then south to Armona where it connected to SP's Coalinga Branch.

Construction of the branch line
The Riverdale Branch was built between August 1910 and July 1911 under SP's non-operating subsidiary, the Hanford and Summit Lake Railway.  SP operated the line and on October 9, 1917, the line was sold to the SP.  SP operated the line as the Riverdale Branch.  Grading commenced to the northwest from Hardwick on August 22, 1910 and rails reached Riverdale one month later.  At the other end of the line, construction began at Ingle and built southwest towards Riverdale; by February 1912 5 miles of track was completed between Ingle and Traquility.  The SP then began operating on these two ends of the line.  The final and middle section of track, between Tranquility and Riverdale, was completed on April 14, 1912.

The track between Hardwick and Riverdale was abandoned by the SP in 1952.  SP later abandoned the track between Riverdale and Burrel.  SP sold the 25.2 mile line between Ingle and Burrell to Kyle Railway's subsidiary, Port Railroads (PRI), on March 13, 1994.  On April 26, 1996, the PRI was sold by Kyle Railways to the San Joaquin Valley Railroad.

Originally, the Hanford & Summit Lake Railway proposed to build en electric railroad from Hanford through Grangeville and Hardwick and back through Lemoore and Armona with an extension to Laton.

The track between Hardwick and Armona was constructed during a different time period, likely before 1912.

Route
 Ingle (Connection with SP's West Side Line)
Tranquility
San Joaquin
Helm
Burrel
Riverdale
Hub
Hardwick (Connection with SP's Caruthers Branch)
Grangeville
Armona (Connection with SP's Coalinga Branch)

References

Rail lines in California
Southern Pacific Railroad
Transportation in Fresno County, California
Transportation in Kings County, California